Yonatan "Yoni" Chetboun (born 13 March 1979) is an Israeli politician and a decorated officer in the Israel Defense Forces (IDF) who currently serves as a Lt. Col. (Res.). He is also author of the book "Under Fire" (Hebrew: "Tahat Esh"). Chetboun served as a member of the Knesset, where he sat on the Foreign Affairs and Defense Committee. During his active-duty service, the IDF awarded him the Chief of Staff Citation for actions taken during the Second Lebanon War. Currently, he runs Kanaf Strategy, a strategic consulting firm for companies and public organizations. He also lectures worldwide on combating terrorism and decision-making under pressure.

Biography
Yonatan ("Yoni") Chetboun was born in Nahariya to French-Jewish parents, soon after they immigrated to Israel. His father, Dr. Israel Chetboun, is a senior cardiologist. His parents named him after Yonatan Netanyahu. After his birth, his family moved to Netanya, where he grew up and attended a Bnei Akiva yeshiva high school. He holds a BA in government diplomacy and strategy, with honors, from the Interdisciplinary Center Herzliya, and an MBA in business management from the Hebrew University. He currently lives in Netanya, and is married to Ma'ayan, the daughter of Australian immigrants, with 8 children.

Military career

In 1998, Chetboun was drafted into the Israel Defense Forces and joined the Golani Brigade. Eventually, he was selected for the Egoz elite unit, which specializes in anti-terror and anti-guerilla operations. During his service, he completed the prestigious infantry officer course and served as a staff commander for Egoz during various anti-terror operations in Lebanon, Gaza, and the Israeli-occupied West Bank. As part of Operation Defensive Shield, his unit was tasked with surrounding the Mukata’a, the office of Yasser Arafat, then Chairman of the Palestinian Authority. Later, he became a company commander.

He was an operations officer for Golani Battalion 51 at the time of the Second Lebanon War and saw action at the Battle of Bint Jbeil. One of the casualties of Bint Jbeil was Major Roi Klein, a friend and commander of Chetboun's, who famously jumped on a grenade to save a number of soldiers on the battlefield. During the battle, Chetboun removed Klein's body from the battlefield and replaced him as commander. Chetboun was awarded the Chief of Staff citation for actions taken during Bint Jbeil. He was discharged from active duty in 2008, but continues to actively serve in the reserves as a Lieutenant Colonel (battalion commander).

Public activism

In 2009, Chetboun organized rallies in support of the IDF and the residents of southern Israel during Operation Cast Lead. Chetboun believed that in the Second Lebanon War, a lack of public support hurt the soldiers he led, and this encouraged him to organize the rallies.

In 2010, Chetboun founded the Ra'ananim Zionist youth movement. The organization was active in strengthening Zionism and Jewish identity among Israeli youth.

At this time, Chetboun also became a speaker for the IDF as well as schools, universities, and conferences, on the topics of leadership and decision making. He also began lecturing to congressmen about Israel's security and its place in the world order. 
In 2012, he joined the Jewish Home party and was elected to the 7th spot on the party list. The party won 12 seats in the next elections, and Chetboun became a member of the 19th Knesset.

On January 15, Chetboun announced he was running for mayor of Netanya in the municipal elections scheduled for October 30, 2018. He garnered 26.71% of the vote in the city, coming second in the race.

Political career
In the Knesset, Chetboun served as the Deputy Speaker of the Knesset, a member of the Foreign Affairs and Defense Committee, and a member of Israel's delegation to NATO. He founded the Neighborhood Forum, which promoted local grassroots leadership. In light of increased immigration from France, he started the Lobby for the Absorption of French Immigrants in Israel. He also founded the Lobby for Standing Army and Reserve Soldiers.

Chetboun passed a number of laws, including:
 Consumer Protection Bill: The bill made supermarket chains honor the full value of food vouchers if they were used within five years. Previously, some chains would take a percentage off of the vouchers.
 Higher Education Council Bill: The bill cancelled the rights to student benefits for those who avoid military service.

During the 19th Knesset, a bill was proposed to enlist ultra-Orthodox Jews into the army. Chetboun led the fight within the coalition against the bill, and provided the only opposition vote. On March 11, 2014, the day before the vote, Chetboun gave a speech to the Knesset entitled "Love Your Neighbor as Yourself".
During the speech, he said: 
 
On December 14, 2014, Chetboun left the Jewish Home party, and joined Eli Yishai's new Yachad party. He stressed his belief in the fact that the new party could bring unity between all sectors in Israel and provide support for the periphery. He was placed second on the party's list for the 2015 Israeli legislative election, but did not receive a seat in the 20th Knesset.

Business career
In 2011, Chetboun founded Kanaf Strategy, of which he is the executive director.
He give lectures to companies and public organizations around the world about Israeli security and decision-making under pressure.

Published works

In June 2016, Chetboun published a book in Hebrew titled Under Fire (Heb.: Tahat Esh) with Yediot Sfarim Publishing, one of the biggest publishing houses in Israel. The book recounts his experiences in the army, including stories from the field and reflection on the effects of service on his family life. It gives insight into the actions of Roi Klein and how Chetboun made decisions under fire in the battlefield. It also describes his ideas regarding Israeli security. The book is being translated into English and French with Gefen Publishing.

Views and opinions
In his book and lecturers, Chetboun outlines three key security concepts:
 Ground maneuvers are still key in both symmetrical and asymmetrical warfare. Modern technology should be used to support ground forces on the battlefield, but should not replace them, so that enemy forces will feel the presence of a military force.
 In order to defeat terrorism, active intelligence should be combined with infantry operations. Infantry must be able to enter densely-populated areas on a consistent basis.
 Countries must possess a clear ideological concept, a belief in the justness of their cause and social-national resilience. The "people's army" model, according to which Israeli civilians from all walks of life participate in compulsory service and in the reserves, is proven to be particularly effective in times of tension. Soldiers can effectively fight for their home even when the leadership is hesitant or indecisive.

References

 

1979 births
People from Netanya
Reichman University alumni
The Jewish Home politicians
Living people
Israeli Orthodox Jews
Israeli military personnel
Members of the 19th Knesset (2013–2015)
People from Nahariya
Israeli people of Moroccan-Jewish descent